834.194 is the seventh studio album by Japanese rock band Sakanaction. The album is a double album. It was released on June 19, 2019, through their own label NF Records, which is a Victor Entertainment subsidiary.

Release 
Prior to the album's release, the band announced an arena tour across Japan. The tour was designed so part of it was held before the album's release, and part was held after, leading to two different experiences. The album was initially scheduled to release on April 24, but was delayed to June 19, 2019. The limited edition of the album came with a 130 minute blu-ray of the band's 10th anniversary concert.

Track listing

Charts

References 

2019 albums
Japanese-language albums
Sakanaction albums